Pudukulam.V is a village panchayat in Sivagangai district in the Indian state of Tamil Nadu.

Geography
It has an average elevation of 70 metres (229 feet).

History
The entire village belongs to the same communities Agamudaiyar under Mukkulathor.

Demographics
 India census, Pudukulam had a population of 1,284. Males constitute 50% of the population and females 50%. Pudukulam has an average literacy rate of 48%, lower than the national average of 59.5%: male literacy is 81%, and female literacy is 68%. In Pudukulam, 12% of the population is under 6 years of age.

Economy
A vast majority of the workforce is dependent on agriculture (72.8%). The principal crop of Pudukulam village is paddy. The other crops that are grown are sugarcane and groundnut.

Politics
Pudukulam comes under Sivaganga assembly constituency is part of Sivaganga (Lok Sabha constituency)

Schools
 Manamadrai Panchayat Board Primary School, Pudukulam

References

 
Cities and towns in Sivaganga district